The Saint Lucia whiptail (Cnemidophorus vanzoi), also known commonly as the Maria Islands whiptail, the Saint Lucian whiptail, and Vanzo's whiptail, is a species of lizard in the family Teiidae. The species is indigenous to the Caribbean.

Geographic range
C. vanzoi is endemic to Saint Lucia, where it has been extirpated from the main island and is now only native to the small islets of Maria Major and Maria Minor, with fewer than 1,000 individuals estimated.  A third population has been established on nearby Praslin Island through translocation.

Habitat
The preferred natural habitats of C. vanzoi are forest and shrubland.

Reproduction
C. vanzoi is oviparous.

Etymology
The specific name, vanzoi, is in honor of Brazilian herpetologist Paulo Vanzolini.

References

Further reading

Baskin JN, Williams EE (1966). "The Lesser Antillean Ameiva (Sauria: Teiidae). Reevaluation, zoogeography, and the effects of predation". Studies on the Fauna of Curaçao and Other Caribbean Islands 23 (89): 144–176. (Ameiva vanzoi, new species, p. 146).
Funk, Stephan M.; Fa, John E. (2006). "Phylogeography of the endemic St. Lucia whiptail lizard Cnemidophorus vanzoi: Conservation genetics at the species boundary". Conservation Genetics 7: 651–663.
Malhotra, Anita; Thorpe, Roger S. (1999). Reptiles & Amphibians of the Eastern Caribbean. London: Macmillan Education Ltd.  (Cnemidophorus vanzoi, pp. 94–95).
Powell, Robert; Henderson, Robert W. (2005). "Conservation Status of Lesser Antillean Reptiles". Iguana 12 (2): 63–77.
Presch W (1971). "Tongue structure of the teiid lizard genera Ameiva and Cnemidophorus with a reallocation of Ameiva vanzoi ". Journal of Herpetology 5 (3/4): 183–185. (Cnemidophorus vanzoi, new combination, p. 184).

External links
Cnemidophorus vanzoi at the Encyclopedia of Life

Cnemidophorus
Reptiles described in 1966
Lizards of the Caribbean
Reptiles of Saint Lucia
Endemic fauna of Saint Lucia
Taxa named by Jonathan N. Baskin
Taxa named by Ernest Edward Williams
Taxonomy articles created by Polbot